Yeyriney Gulf (Russian: Ейринейская губа, Yeyrineyskaya Guba) is a small bay in Khabarovsk Krai, Russian Federation.

Geography

Yeyriney Gulf is located on the northern coast of the Sea of Okhotsk. It lies to the west of the mountainous Lisyansky Peninsula and is entered between Cape Shil'kan to the west and Cape Yeyrineysky to the east. The gulf is 6.43 km (about 4 mi) wide and about 24 m (79 ft) deep at its halfway point. Its head is divided into two recesses by Cape Kekurnyy.

History

American whaleships sent whaleboats into the gulf to chase bowhead whales in the 1840s.

References

Bays of the Sea of Okhotsk
Bays of Khabarovsk Krai